Acanthospermum hispidum (bristly starbur, goat's head, hispid starburr, starbur) is an annual plant in the family Asteraceae, which is native to Central and South America. This plant is cited as a weed in cotton culture in Brazil, and it is also used as a medicinal plant. It is also naturalized in many scattered places in Eurasia, Africa, and North America It is naturalized in Australia and is a declared weed in Western Australia.

References

External links

Pacific Island Ecosystems at Risk: Acanthospermum hispidum 
University of Florida: Acanthospermum hispidum
 Acanthospermum hispidum photos

hispidum
Flora of South America
Plants described in 1836